Jack's Family Restaurants, LP (doing business as Jack's) is an American fast food restaurant chain, headquartered and based in Birmingham, and is owned by AEA Investors.  Restaurants feature sit-down dining, drive-thrus and takeout service. The menu features primarily burgers, fried chicken, breakfast and various other fast food items including french fries and soft drinks.

, there were 202 Jack's restaurants in operation; all corporate owned. The company opens new locations at a rate of 15 per year.

History
Jack's was founded on November 21, 1960, by Jack Caddell as a single walk-up stand in Homewood, Alabama, a suburb of Birmingham. This location still operates today after several remodels, the most recent in 2019, and is the chain's flagship store.

The original menu featured items such as fifteen-cent hamburgers and fries, twenty-cent shakes, and a twenty-cent "Fish-On-A-Bun."  Jack's rapidly expanded and by the mid-1960s, they had more than a half dozen locations in the Birmingham metro area: the original Homewood store, Roebuck, 3rd Avenue West, Bessemer, Five Points West, Vestavia, Eastwood Mall, Alabaster and Center Point, and additional stores as far away as Mississippi and South Carolina. 

In the mid to late 1970s, Jack's was expanding into south Alabama and the Florida panhandle.  In the 1980s many of these locations began to close, but at least one individual was having success with Jack's.  Benny LaRussa, primarily involved in the grocery business, had purchased a single franchise in the 1960s.  In 1979, LaRussa abandoned groceries and purchased a franchise territory of 13 Jack's stores.  From then until 1988 he expanded his territory to 33 stores.  Then, in 1988, LaRussa purchased the total franchise rights to the Jack's concept. In 2015, Jack's was acquired by a fund managed by Onex Corporation, a private equity company based in Toronto, Canada.

On July 25, 2019, Onex announced that it had reached a deal to sell Jack's Family Restaurants in a deal expected to close in the third quarter of 2019. The deal finally closed in August 2019. Onex did not disclose the buyer or financial terms of the deal, but Restaurant Business Online reported that AEA Investors, a private equity firm based in New York, is the buyer of the restaurant chain.

Trademark design
Jack's restaurants were originally walk-up stands with a slanted roof and vertical orange and yellow stripes on each side.  In the late 1960s, the chain began converting their walk-up stands to full, dine-in restaurants.  Most upgraded restaurants featured faux stone walls.

The original signs were on 5 poles and featured "Jack's" in five individual white rectangles on top with the word "Hamburgers" on a separate sign underneath. A small round sign below had the price of the hamburgers, "15¢". Another sign that shared 3 poles and had "Fries 15¢ Shakes 20¢" written on it, and the final sign shared the opposite 3 poles and had "Self-Service" written on it. Several elements had their writing changed over time, and the last one in the chain, Dora, Al, was removed in 2019 during a remodel.

In the mid-1970s, Jack's began using new signage featuring the name written on an angle in white inside a red circle; the word "Hamburgers" was dropped.  In the early 2000s, Jack's changed the logo from the original, all capital font to a mixed-case font.  It still appears on the familiar red circle, but the circle is smaller so that the text extends outside of it.

See also
Milo's Hamburgers, another Alabama-based burger restaurant similar to Jack's
 List of hamburger restaurants

References

External links
 Official website

Companies based in Birmingham, Alabama
Restaurants in Birmingham, Alabama
Jefferson County, Alabama
Fast-food chains of the United States
Fast-food hamburger restaurants
Fast-food franchises
Regional restaurant chains in the United States
Restaurants established in 1960
1960 establishments in Alabama